The 2006 All-Pacific-10 Conference football team consists of American football players chosen by various organizations for All-Pacific-10 Conference teams for the 2006 college football season. The USC Trojans and California Golden Bears won the conference, posting 7–2 conference records. USC then beat the Michigan Wolverines in the Rose Bowl 32 to 18. California running back Marshawn Lynch was voted Pac-10 Offensive Player of the Year. California cornerback Daymeion Hughes was voted Pat Tillman Pac-10 Defensive Player of the Year.

Offensive selections

Quarterbacks
John David Booty, USC (Coaches-1)
Alex Brink, Washington St. (Coaches-2)

Running backs
Marshawn Lynch#, California (Coaches-1)
Yvenson Bernard, Oregon St. (Coaches-1)
Jonathan Stewart, Oregon (Coaches-2)
Ryan Torain, Arizona St. (Coaches-2)

Wide receivers
Steve Smith, USC (Coaches-1)
DeSean Jackson, California (Coaches-1)
Dwayne Jarrett, USC (Coaches-1)
Jason Hill, Washington St. (Coaches-2)
Sammie Stroughter, Oregon St. (Coaches-2)

Tight ends
Zach Miller, Arizona St. (Coaches-1)
Craig Stevens, California (Coaches-2)

Tackles
Sam Baker, USC (Coaches-1)
Adam Koets, Oregon St. (Coaches-2)

Guards
Jeremy Perry, Oregon St. (Coaches-1)
Kyle DeVan, Oregon St. (Coaches-1)
Mike Pollak, Arizona St. (Coaches-2)
Chilo Rachal, USC (Coaches-2)
Mike Gibson, California (Coaches-2)

Centers
Ryan Kalil#, USC (Coaches-1)
Alex Mack, California (Coaches-1)
Enoka Lucas, Oregon (Coaches-1)
Max Unger, Oregon (Coaches-2)

Defensive selections

Ends
Mkristo Bruce, Washington St. (Coaches-1)
Justin Hickman, UCLA (Coaches-1)
Bruce Davis, UCLA (Coaches-2)
Lawrence Jackson, USC (Coaches-2)
Louis Holmes, Arizona (Coaches-2)
Nu'u Tafisi, California (Coaches-2)

Tackles
Brandon Mebane#, California (Coaches-1)
Sedrick Ellis, USC (Coaches-1)

Linebackers
Desmond Bishop, California (Coaches-1)
Rey Maualuga,  USC (Coaches-1)
Michael Okwo, Stanford (Coaches-1)
Keith Rivers, USC (Coaches-1)
Brian Cushing, USC (Coaches-2)
Scott White, Washington (Coaches-2)
Derrick Doggett, Oregon St. (Coaches-2)
Spencer Larson, Arizona (Coaches-2)

Cornerbacks
Antoine Cason, Arizona (Coaches-1)
Dante Hughes#, California (Coaches-1)
Terrell Thomas, USC (Coaches-2)

Safeties
Eric Frampton, Washington St. (Coaches-1)
Sabby Piscitelli, Oregon St. (Coaches-1)
C. J. Wallace, Washington (Coaches-1)
Chris Horton, UCLA (Coaches-2)
J. D. Nelson, Oregon (Coaches-2)
Michael Johnson, Arizona (Coaches-2)

Special teams

Placekickers
Justin Medlock, UCLA (Coaches-1)
Alexis Serna, Oregon St. (Coaches-2)

Punters
Nick Folk, Arizona (Coaches-1)
Andrew Larson, California (Coaches-2)

Return specialists 
Syndric Steptoe, Arizona (Coaches-1)
DeSean Jackson, California (Coaches-1)
Terry Richardson, Arizona St. (Coaches-2)
Sammie Stroughter, Oregon St. (Coaches-2)

Special teams player
Wopamo Osaisai, Stanford (Coaches-1)
Bryon Storer, California (Coaches-1)

Key
Coaches = selected by Pac-12 coaches

# = unanimous selection by coaches

See also
2006 College Football All-America Team

References

All-Pacific-10 Conference Football Team
All-Pac-12 Conference football teams